Hyde is an unincorporated community located in the town of Ridgeway, Iowa County, Wisconsin, United States. The community was named for William Hyde, who opened a saw mill in the area in 1856.

References

Unincorporated communities in Iowa County, Wisconsin
Unincorporated communities in Wisconsin